Lars Magnus Wohlin (24 June 1933 – 24 September 2018) was a Swedish politician and Member of the European Parliament (MEP). He was elected into the European Parliament as a member of the June List, but later joined Kristdemokraterna.

He sat on the European Parliament's Committee on Economic and Monetary Affairs. He was also a substitute for the Committee on Budgets, a member of the temporary committee on policy challenges and budgetary means of the enlarged Union 2007–2013, and a member of the delegation for relations with the countries of Southeast Asia and the Association of Southeast Asian Nations.

Career
 Degree in economics (1960)
 Ph.D. economics (Stockholm, 1970)
 Assistant professor, University of Uppsala
 Head of the Research Institute of Industrial Economics (1973-1976)
 Undersecretary of State, Ministry of Finance (1976-1979)
 Head of Sveriges Riksbank (Bank of Sweden) (1979-1982)
 Head of Stadshypotek (mortgage bank) 1982–1996)
 Member of the Board of Bank for International Settlements
 Governor representing Sweden on the Board of the IMF

References

External links
Official website
European Parliament biography

1933 births
2018 deaths
June List MEPs
Christian Democrats (Sweden) MEPs
MEPs for Sweden 2004–2009
Stockholm School of Economics alumni
Academic staff of Uppsala University
Governors of Sveriges Riksbank
Swedish bankers